Morningside railway station is a station on the Western Line of the Auckland Railway Network. It has an island platform and is accessed via a level crossing on Morningside Drive and by a subway from New North Road.

History 

 1880: It opened as one of the original stations on the North Auckland Line.
 1914: A signal box was established here.
 1966: The line between Morningside and Avondale was partially double-tracked and the platform was upgraded to an island platform layout.
 1993: The platform was modified slightly to meet the requirements of new ex-Perth trains.
 2009: An upgraded station was opened.
 2013: In February, a woman in a wheelchair which was stuck in the tracks was rescued from the path of an approaching train.
 2014: Electrification infrastructure installed as part of the electrification of Auckland's railway network.

Bus transfers 

Bus routes 20, 22N, 22R, 22A and 209 pass close to Morningside station.

In media 
Morningside Station was featured in the music video for Lorde's song "Royals".

See also 
 List of Auckland railway stations
 Public transport in Auckland

References 

Rail transport in Auckland
Railway stations in New Zealand
Railway stations opened in 1880
Buildings and structures in Auckland